Glen Ford (born Glen Rutherford; November 5, 1949 – July 28, 2021), was an American journalist, who, along with Bruce Dixon and Margaret Kimberley, co-founded Black Agenda Report.  He was a socialist, a Vietnam War-era military veteran and a member of the Black Panther Party.  He served in the news media over many years in his professional life.  He was the Capitol Hill, State Department and White House correspondent for the Mutual Black Network, an American radio network.  He co-launched, produced, and hosted the first nationally syndicated Black news interview program on commercial television, America’s Black Forum, in 1977.

Personal life
Ford was born November 5, 1949, in Jersey City, New Jersey to an Irish American mother, Shirley, who was a civil rights activist from New Jersey. His father, a Black Radio Hall of Fame inductee, Rudy “The Deuce” Rutherford, himself born in Richland, Georgia, who was the first Black man in the Deep South to host a non-gospel television program: Rocking with The Deuce. After his parents divorced, he spent parts of his childhood in both New Jersey and Georgia.

Ford died on July 28, 2021, at the age of 71, from cancer in Manhattan.

Career
Ford began his radio career reading news wire copy at age 11. His first full-time position on-air was at a James Brown-owned radio station, WRDW in Augusta, Georgia.  It was there that Brown shortened his name to 'Ford.'

After serving four years in the Army, he worked as a radio journalist in Georgia and Maryland, before taking a job in 1974 in Washington, D.C. with the Mutual Black Network.

Ford was highly critical of the candidacy and presidency of Barack Obama. During Obama's re-election campaign in 2012, in a discussion with sociologist Michael Eric Dyson, Ford said that "Obama is not the lesser of evils, but the more effective evil. And we base that on his record and also on his rhetoric at the convention."

Later in that debate he described Obama's foreign policy as imperialistic, pointing out that "this is one of the great historical legacies of the Obama administration. He has ignored international law, laws that have evolved over hundreds of years, ignored the sovereignty of nations."

Works 
 The Big Lie: Analysis of U.S. Press Coverage of the Grenada Invasion. Prague: International Organization of Journalists, 1985.
 The Black Agenda. OR Books, 2021.

References

External links 
 
 Glen Ford's contributions on The Real News Network (TRNN)
 "Glen Ford's Ethical Dilemma" (video)
 Twitter account
 LA Progressive

African-American journalists
African-American non-fiction writers
American people of Irish descent
American political writers
African-American radio personalities
African-American television talk show hosts
American social commentators
Activists from Georgia (U.S. state)
African-American activists
American anti-capitalists
American Marxists
American anti-poverty advocates
African-American Marxists
Members of the Black Panther Party
Writers from Georgia (U.S. state)
People from Columbus, Georgia
1949 births
2021 deaths
21st-century African-American writers
American male non-fiction writers